Alexander Ferdinandovich Kelch was a Russian nobleman who lived in St Petersburg at the end of the 19th century.  He is remembered mainly as a patron of Fabergé, having commissioned the Kelch Gothic Revival silver service and seven eggs  for his wife Barbara (Varvara).

His wealth came from marrying his brother's widow Varvara Petrovna Bazanova, whose family had made a fortune in Siberian industry, particularly gold-mining.  The Bazanov business empire collapsed after the Russo-Japanese War; the couple divorced in 1915, Varvara moving to Paris and Alexander remaining as a pauper in Russia; he was arrested and disappeared in Siberia in 1930.

Notes

References

 

Nobility from the Russian Empire
Year of birth missing
Year of death missing
Nobility from Saint Petersburg